Charlie & Boots is a 2009 Australian film starring Paul Hogan and Shane Jacobson. It had the best opening weekend for any Australian film in 2009 when it was released on Father's Day (1 September 2009). The film features many small towns in country Australia. It also has a cameo by Reg Evans, who died in the 2009 Victorian bushfires before the film was released, and the film is dedicated to the victims of the fires.

Plot
Shane Jacobson plays Boots who takes his father (Paul Hogan) on a trip to fish on the northernmost tip of Australia because of something his father told him when he was a kid. Although he probably wasn't serious and can't remember it Boots decides to carry it out. They travel on a road trip from Victoria to the Cape York Peninsula in a Holden Kingswood, passing through towns like Tamworth. The film starts with the death of Gracie, Boots' mother and Charlie's wife. After Gracie's death, Boots goes to visit Charlie on the family farm, finding him locked away in the house in the dark, curtains drawn. Boots looks at a calendar on the wall with a picture of Cape York and remembers his father promising to take him fishing off the northernmost tip of Australia. As the trip starts out, Boots and Charlie seem tense, but as the days pass they begin to rekindle their father-son relationship.

Their journey involves visiting different towns, hang-outs in different restaurants, and visiting famous attractions. On their way, they start to reconcile and express their emotions about the recent death of Gracie, Charlie's wife and Boots's mother, and the drama unfolding around the death of Ben, Boots' son, by drowning.

They even help a young 16-year-old girl named Jess by allowing her to escape her boyfriend Tristan and aid her in her dream to go to the famous country city of Tamworth. The trio manage to arrive in the town, and Jess plays one of her songs in the famous large hall, after passing a manager. They push a car they thought was owned by a Tristan out of a car park at night and end up damaging it. They fly in a small aircraft with a pilot (Roy Billing). From the craft, they see the Great Barrier Reef. The pilot continuously hits the altitude meter, making Boots feel nervous. They are dropped off by the pilot and they both wave goodbye as it leaves. In the end, Charlie and Boots both make it to their destination, Cape York, the northernmost tip of Australia. They take their fishing rods and quote a few sentences they traveled with on their journey. As the credits roll, we learn that Jess has been discovered by a music industry manager and has made a single about an obnoxious boyfriend. At the end of the credits, we see a brief clip of Charlie and Boots traveling over the Sydney Harbour Bridge. They look up from their car in awe, causing Boots to marvel at how big the bridge is. Charlie quips "Yeah... imagine having to paint (it)" – a dig at Hogan's pre-fame occupation as a worker on it.

Cast

 Paul Hogan as Charlie McFarland
 Alan Powell as Rodeo Clown
 Morgan Griffin as Jess
 Shane Jacobson as Boots McFarland
 Deborah Kennedy as Miles Waitress
 Reg Evans as Mac
 Roy Billing as Roly
 Alec Wilson as Rodeo Worker 1
 Val Lehman as Edna (Bowling Lady Driver) (billed as Valerie Lehman)
 Lisa N Edwards as Graeme's Wife
 Di Smith as Strawberry Lady (as Diane Smith)
 Anne Phelan as Female Truckie
 Bec Asha as Gunbar Waitress (billed as Rebecca Asha)
 Danny Baldwin as Bucking Horse Rider
 Beverley Dunn as Val
 Andy Pappas as Shearer 2
 Michael Morley as Young Cowboy Rodeo
 Sam Elia as Motorbike Cop
 Scott Harrison as Graeme
 Stewart Faichney as Truck Driver
 Anthony Hammer as Tristan	
 Richard Payten as Toilet Guy
 Eloise Grace as Masseuse
 Charlotte Victoria as Granddaughter		
 Deb Fryers as Massage Girl 1
 Patrick O'Meara as Rodeo Worker 2
 Fiona MacGregor as Toowoomba Waitress 1
 Patricia Wood as Bowling Lady
 Tanya Cinelli as Toowoomba Waitress 2
 Baxter James Thomson as Ben
 John Nutting as himself
 Anthony Sargeant as Country Band
 Robert McGluggage as Funeral Guest
 Joe Faulkner as Cowboy
 Ann Hurst as Bowling Lady
 John Leonard as Radio DJ
 Christopher Gaudion as Bull Rider
 Rob Mills as Rodeo Announcer
 Catherine Thomson as Therese
 Barbara MacMillan as Marge
 Korey Greehaigh as Troublemakers
 Adam Knowles as Rodeo Clown		
 Bernie Hoefnagels as Motel Owner
 Steve Lack as Traveller
 Shelley Minson as Country Band
 Brodie Greenhalgh as Troublemakers
 Laline Engman as Massage Girl 2
 Cory Ford as Bull Rider
 Dallas Powell as Bucking Horse Rider
 Christopher Bruce as Grandson		
 T.J. Alcaniz as Not Mexican Waiter
 Mary Fanello as Vendor Lady
 Matt Scullion as Country Band Singer
 Susan McGrath as Neighbour
 Peggy Thompson as Grace
 Brett Tomlin as Country Band
 Marisa Jones as Jogger
 Raheel Abid as Petrol Station Attendant
 Anne Herd as Line Dancer
 Shelley Moser as Leilani
 Dallas Olsen as Shearer 1
 Troy Furley as Holden Museum Guide
 Lesley Hurst as Bowling Lady
 Ross Stockham as Bull Rider
 Helen Hoefnagels as Breakfast Lady
 Heidi Williams as Woman with Tray
 Lawrie Minson as Country Band
 Brett Lobsey as Country Band
 Jean Hyde as Line Dancer

Music
 Jack, single by songwriter Lianna Rose

Production
Filming took place in Warrnambool, Horsham, Echuca, Hay, Tamworth, Tenterfield, Emerald and the Cape York Peninsula.

Reception
The film received generally positive reviews with 58% positive rating on Rotten Tomatoes from 12 reviews as of July 2019. It was called a "likeable family comedy" by Sandra Hall of The Sydney Morning Herald and "a superbly relaxed and good-natured film" by Evan Williams of The Australian.

References

External links

2000s road movies
2009 films
Australian road movies
Fictional duos
Films set in Australia
Films scored by Dale Cornelius
2000s English-language films
Screen Australia films
Transmission Films films